The Driver is a 1978 crime film. It may also refer to:

The Driver (TV series), the BBC One television series
The Driver (Buddy Rich album), the Buddy Rich album
The Driver (Charles Kelley album), the Charles Kelley album
The Driver (novel), the Garet Garrett novel
The Driver Bastille song from the mixtape Other People's Heartache, Pt. 2
The Driver, a 1979 electromechanical arcade game that features 16mm film-based visuals. 
"The Driver", a 2015 song by Scottish musician Momus from his album Turpsycore

See also
Drive (disambiguation)
Driver (disambiguation)